The 2011 African Judo Championships were the 32nd edition of the African Judo Championships, and were held in Dakar, Senegal from 14 April to 17 April 2011.

Medal overview

Men

Women

Medals table

References

External links
 

A
African Judo Championships
African Judo Championships
International sports competitions hosted by Senegal
African Judo Championships, 2011
Sports competitions in Dakar
21st century in Dakar
Judo competitions in Senegal
April 2011 sports events in Africa